Benjamin Arnold may refer to:

Benjamin Lee Arnold (died 1892), American academic and university president
Benjamin W. Arnold of Benjamin Walworth Arnold House and Carriage House
Benjamin Green Arnold, founding president of the Coffee Exchange in the 1880s.

See also
Ben Arnold (disambiguation)